The 2007 All-Ireland Under-21 Football Championship was the 44th staging of the All-Ireland Under-21 Football Championship since its establishment by the Gaelic Athletic Association in 1964.

Mayo entered the championship as defending champions, however, they were defeated by Laois in the All-Ireland semi-final.

On 5 May 2007, Cork won the championship following a 2-10 to 0-15 defeat of Laois in the All-Ireland final. This was their 10th All-Ireland title overall and their first in 13 championship seasons.

Results

Munster Under-21 Football Championship

Quarter-finals

Semi-finals

Final

All-Ireland Under-21 Football Championship

Semi-finals

Final

References

2007
All-Ireland Under-21 Football Championship